Magda Giannikou is a Greek composer, film scorer, singer, pianist and accordionist.

Early life and education
Giannikou was born 27 January 1981, in Athens, Greece. She taught in Greek elementary schools and composed music for TV and theater productions in Athens. In Greece, she participated in over 50 children's productions and began her training in classical music and jazz. Giannikou graduated from the National Conservatory of Greece with a Certificate of Excellence. She also studied at the Philippos Nakas Conservatory  in Athens.

Giannikou went on to study film scoring at Berklee College of Music in Boston, Massachusetts, USA, graduating in 2008. In 2009, Giannikou was selected to be a Fellow at the Sundance Institute Composers Lab.

Career
In 2010, Giannikou formed Banda Magda, a New York-based band, with an international group of musicians, including some fellow Berklee alumni. Their multilingual music is influenced by Latin American styles (such as samba), French chansons and Greek folk music. Banda Magda has toured in 22 countries. Their 2013 album, Amour, t'es la?, reached #9 on Billboard's Top World Music Albums chart.

Filmography
Giannikou has composed music for several films and a TV show:
2014: Watchers of the Sky
2012: Louie
2011: Natural Selection
2010: La tropa de trapo en el país donde siempre brilla el sol

In 2016 Giannikou was the recording producer for the second season of Mobile Suit Gundam: Iron-Blooded Orphans.

References

External links
Biography (Banda Magda official site)
Banda Magda concert review (WGBH.com, 2017)

1981 births
Living people
Berklee College of Music alumni
21st-century composers
GroundUPmusic artists
Greek singer-songwriters
Singers from Athens
Musicians from Athens
Greek voice actresses